Rafiu Adekunle Durosinmi (born 1 January 2003) is a Nigerian  professional footballer who plays as a Centre-Forward for Viktoria Plzeň on loan from Czech National Football League club Karviná.

Early life

Durosinmi was born in Lagos, Nigeria.

Club career

Karviná

Before joining Karvina, he played youth football in Nigeria. In 2022, he was promoted to the first team. During his first season, he scored 3 goals, including one against Slavia. In January 2023, Durosinmi was loaned to Viktoria Plzeň. After arriving on loan, he played a friendly for Viktoria Plzeň.

Style of play

He is known for his height and technical ability.

Career statistics

Club

Honours

References

External links

2003 births
Living people
Nigerian footballers
Association football forwards
MFK Karviná players
Czech National Football League players
FC Viktoria Plzeň players
Expatriate footballers in the Czech Republic
Nigerian expatriate sportspeople in the Czech Republic